"Run Away" is a song by German Eurodance and pop music project Real McCoy (also known as M.C. Sar & The Real McCoy) from their album, Another Night (1995), which was the US version of their second album, Space Invaders (1994). The song was first produced in 1994 in Germany by the music producers Juergen Wind (J. Wind) and Frank Hassas (Quickmix) under the producer team name "Freshline". It was first released in Europe in July 1994 as the group's third single from their second album, Space Invaders. When the song was released in America in February 1995 as single, it gained immense popularity and reached number three on the US Billboard Hot 100, where it was certified Gold, and number six in the UK. A music video was produced to promote the single, made especially for the European market, directed by Swedish-based director Matt Broadley.

Chart performance
"Run Away" proved to be very successful on the charts on several continents, becoming one of Real McCoy's biggest hits to date. It made its way into the top 10 in Finland (4), Ireland (5), Scotland (5) and the UK, where it peaked at number six on January 29, 1995, in its second week at the UK Singles Chart. Additionally, the song was a top 20 hit in Belgium (11) and Sweden (11), as well as on the Eurochart Hot 100, where it reached number 12 in February. 

Outside Europe, "Run Away" went to number three on the US Billboard Hot 100, the Billboard Hot Dance Club Play chart and the Cash Box Top 100. In Canada, it reached number 13 on The Record singles chart, number 33 on the RPM Top Singles chart, while also peaking at number ten on the RPM Dance/Urban chart. Additionally, the song hit number four in Australia, number five in Zimbabwe and number six in New Zealand.

Critical reception
AllMusic editor Bryan Buss named "Run Away" one of the standout tracks from Another Night. Larry Flick from Billboard stated that this follow-up to the certified platinum "Another Night" "does not tamper with the European dance act's winning (and much-copied) formula of bouncy hi-NRG rhythms, topped with throaty male rapping and female chirping at the chorus. Single has already begun to gather deserved airplay from a number of crossover and top 40 stations on import—its domestic release almost guarantees instant success." Chuck Eddy from Entertainment Weekly wrote that the Berlin trio "has invaded U.S. radio by tap-dancing space-invader-disco synths beneath soul-diva testifying, "Sprockets"-accented raps, and Martian munchkin chatter. Yet there's an odd paranoid undercurrent flowing through tunes like "Run Away" — the best dance-pop here isn't merely escapist; it's about escaping." Dave Sholin from the Gavin Report felt that "the title of this one says it all. Programmers have been playing this import since late last year and now the official release is here. This one should be as big or bigger than their debut release".

Howard Cohen from Herald-Journal described it as "tuneful". Robbie Daw from Idolator declared it as "energetic" and "strobelight-friendly". A reviewer from Liverpool Echo called it a "rousing pop/rap track with an escapist message." Dennis Hunt of Los Angeles Times viewed it as "awfully catchy". In his weekly UK chart commentary, James Masterton said, "All the elements that made "Another Night" such a smash are here once again, it may be a standard Eurohit formula but it works so why argue? MC Sar mutters and grumbles to an electronic backing pausing only to let the chorus in at regular intervals." Pan-European magazine Music & Media encouraged, "Take a bit of this smooth slice of Eurodance, which serves as a preview for the forthcoming Space Invaders album. As the title implies ambient influences are present, even in the radio mixes." Alan Jones from Music Week called it "horribly catchy", adding that it "will be another substantial hit." John Kilgo from The Network Forty described it as "dynamite". People Magazine felt songs like this "pack so many beats into 4 minutes that just listening to them is thoroughly exhausting." James Hamilton from the RM Dance Update deemed it a "less distinctive follow-up" and "Boney M-ish".

Music video
There were produced two different music videos for "Run Away". The first version, made for the European market and directed by Swedish-based director Matt Broadley,
features singer Patricia "Patsy" Petersen walking in a desert-like setting while miming the vocals of studio singer Karin Kasar. The American version, directed by British music video and film director Nigel Dick, is set in a factory with many exhausted "slave-like" workers, while rapper Olaf "O-Jay" Jeglitza plays the role of "Big Brother", monitoring the workers' progress and demanding maximum productivity from them. It was never released for public broadcasting, since Arista felt that the image of the video was too dark and negative.

The European version was later published on YouTube in 2006, while the US version was published in 2009. The videos has amassed more than 5.5 million and 12 million views as of January 2023.

Impact and legacy
Idolator featured "Run Away" in their list of "The 50 Best Pop Singles of 1995" in 2015. American entertainment company BuzzFeed ranked it number 56 in their list of "The 101 Greatest Dance Songs of the '90s" in 2017. In 2019, Billboard placed it at number 419 in their ranking of "Billboards Top Songs of the '90s".

Official mixes and remixes

 "Run Away" (Airplay Mix I) 3:52
 "Run Away" (Airplay Mix II) 3:58 - edit of the ‘Pulsar Mix‘
 "Run Away" (Video Mix/House Mix) 3:05 - edit of the ‘Reel House Mix‘
 "Run Away" (Album Version/Original Version) 4:01 - taken from "Space Invaders"; edit of the ‘Club Attack Mix’
 "Run Away" (Single Version) 4:03 - taken from "Another Night"; alternate mix of the ‘Airplay Mix I‘
 "Run Away" (Club Attack Mix) 5:45
 "Run Away" (Reel House Mix) 5:45
 "Run Away" (Fly N' Away Mix) 6:00
 "Run Away" (Progressiv Mix) 4:30

 "Run Away" (Pulsar Mix) 6:02
 "Run Away" (Hallucination Mix) 5:35
 "Run Away" (Sudden Boom Mix) 5:27
 "Run Away" (Progressive House Mix) 5:58
 "Run Away" (Hooligan Mix) 5:43
 "Run Away" (Sound Factory Mix Vox Up) 8:20
 "Run Away" (Sound Factory Mix Vox Down) 8:20
 "Run Away" (Factory Dub) 8:05
 "Run Away" (Dubstramental) 7:56
 "Run Away" (Armand's Mighty Morphin Mix) 7:44
 "Run Away" (Lenny B's Classic House Mix) 5:12

Charts

Weekly charts

Year-end charts

Trivia
 In October 1994, a promotional version of this track was released to select Rhythmic Top 40 / dance radio stations in Chicago and Orlando.  This was a more upbeat and enhanced remix of the Space Invaders / Club Attack Mix, and was never released on any album or single.
 The song's lyrics were influenced by George Orwell's novel Nineteen Eighty-Four.

References

1994 singles
1995 singles
1994 songs
Arista Records singles
Real McCoy (band) songs
Electronic songs
English-language German songs
Music videos directed by Matt Broadley
Music videos directed by Nigel Dick
Songs written by Jürgen Wind